The UCD Michael Smurfit Graduate Business School is the graduate business school of University College Dublin (UCD) and is located in Blackrock, Dublin, Ireland, on the site of the former teacher-training Carysfort College. Undergraduate business education is provided by the Quinn School of Business on the main Belfield campus of UCD. 

It originates from the UCD Faculty of Commerce, founded in 1908, which became the first institution in Europe to offer a Master of Business Administration (MBA) degree, in 1964. In 2018 the Financial Times ranked the school as 1st in Ireland and 23rd overall in their ranking of the Top 100 Business Schools in Europe. UCD's Michael Smurfit Graduate Business School is ranked 28th in the Financial Times' ranking of leading European Business Schools in 2021. The business school's Masters in International Management is ranked 3rd in the world.

Memberships
The Smurfit School is a member institution of the Association to Advance Collegiate Schools of Business International (AACSB), the European Quality Improvement System (EQUIS), the quality improvement system administered by the European Foundation for Management Development, and the Association of MBAs. The school is also a member of the Global Alliance in Management Education, an alliance of 26 academic institutions and over 50 leading multinational corporations.

Rankings
In 2018 the Financial Times ranked the school as the best business school in Ireland and 23rd in the top 100 business schools in Europe. The Economist Intelligence Unit ranked the full-time MBA programme 63rd in the world in 2014. The Financial Times ranked the school 89th in the world's top 100 full-time MBA programs (2018), while it ranked the Smurfit School's executive MBA programme 94th in the world (2014) and 41st in Europe (2015). Smurfit is the only Irish institute that has made into the top 100 in the Financial Times rankings. The business school's Masters in International Management is ranked eighth in the world.

People

Benefactors
 Michael Smurfit – business executive
 Denis O'Brien – business executive

Teachers and Professors
 Conor Brady – newspaper editor 
 Brian Hillery – politician
 Jim Power – economist

Alumni
 Michael Beary – Irish Army general and former UNIFIL commander
 Sarah Carey – columnist and broadcaster 
 Ciarán Hope – Fulbright Scholar and composer of orchestral, choral, and film music 
 Conor McNamara – sports commentator 
 Derval O'Rourke – athlete
 Nóirín O'Sullivan – Garda Commissioner
 Julie-Ann Russell – footballer
 Eóin Tennyson – Alliance Party MLA for Upper Bann

Board members/Advisors
 Kathleen Murphy – lawyer and business executive
 Margaret Brennan – CBS News correspondent
 Phillip Matthews – director

References

External links

University College Dublin
Blackrock, Dublin
Business schools in the Republic of Ireland